"Dagny" is a song written by Owe Thörnqvist and recorded by him on a 1958 EP. The song lyrics tell the story of "Dagny", a waitress girl at "Café 7:an".

A Lalla Hansson recording charted at 11 weeks between 1 July and 9 September 1973, peaking at second position. The song is also common at sing-along events in Sweden.

At Dansbandskampen 2009, the song was recorded by The Playtones and appeared on their 2010 album Rock'n'Roll Dance Party.

A heavy metal version was recorded by Flintstens med Stanley.

The song is one of the titles in the book Tusen svenska klassiker (2009).

References 

1958 songs
The Playtones songs
Lalla Hansson songs
Swedish-language songs
Swedish songs
Songs written by Owe Thörnqvist
Metronome Records singles